Karen Green may refer to:

 Karen Green (artist), American artist and author
 Karen Green (philosopher), Australian philosopher
 Karen Green, a character in Mark Z. Danielewski's 2000 novel House of Leaves